Gennady Ivanovich Voronov (Rameshki, Tver Governorate,  – Moscow, 1 April 1994) was a Soviet-Russian statesman who was from 1962 to 1971 the Chairman of the Council of Ministers of the Russian SFSR, literally meaning Premier or Prime Minister.

Biography 
Voronov was born in Tver province, Russia, the son of a teacher. Trained as an electrician, he graduated from an Industrial InstTomskitute in 1936. In 1937, during the Great Purge, when mass arrests created vacancies for new party officials, he was appointed head of the Agitprop department at district level in Tomsk. In 1939, he was appointed second secretary, and in 1948, First Secretary of the Chita regional party committee. He was a member of the Central Committee in 1952-76. In May 1955, the head of the soviet communist party, Nikita Khrushchev had him transferred to Moscow as Director of Egg Farming in the USSR Ministry of Agriculture. While Khrushchev was engaged in a power struggle with Georgy Malenkov and others, Voronov showed his loyalty by signing a written statement demanding that Malenkov and five others should be sacked and subjected to an investigation to consider whether they should be expelled from the party. In 1957-61, he was First Secretary of the Orenburg regional party committee.

In January 1961, Voronov was recalled to Moscow and appointed a candidate member of the Praesidium (or Politburo and deputy chairman of the bureau in charge of the communist party in the RSFSR. He was promoted to the post of 'prime minister' of the RSFSR in December 1962. His specialist field was agriculture. According to the journalist Michel Tatu, who was based in Moscow at the time: 

A former party official who worked with Voronov described him of sounding like a "mannered provincial lecturer" than a high ranking statesman, who "talked a lot about attention to agriculture, especially animal husbandry, tediously."

At the Central Committee plenum which removed Khrushchev from office, Voronov complained that he had not been allowed to express an opinion for three and a half years without being shouted at by Khrushchev, who considered himself an expert on  agriculture. When Khrushchev tried to defend himself, Voronov shouted at him "You have no friends here!"

But his relations with the new General Secretary, Leonid Brezhnev were no better. They clashed on a series of matters, including the decision to invade Czechoslovakia in 1968, which Voronov opposed. In  1971, he was removed from office and relegated to the lesser position of Chairman of the USSR People's Control Committee. He resigned in April 1973, and was removed from the Politburo, and retired on a pension.

Awards 
Voronov was awarded two Orders of Lenin.

References 

1910 births
1994 deaths
People from Rameshkovsky District
Heroes of Socialist Labour
Recipients of the Order of Lenin
Central Committee of the Communist Party of the Soviet Union members
Politburo of the Central Committee of the Communist Party of the Soviet Union members
Russian communists
Heads of government of the Russian Soviet Federative Socialist Republic